The arrondissement of Cayenne is an arrondissement of France in French Guiana department in French Guiana region. It has 10 communes (since October 2022). It is the smallest of the three arrondissements in French Guiana, but also its most populated.

Composition

The communes of the arrondissement of Cayenne, and their INSEE codes, are:

 Cayenne (97302)
 Iracoubo (97303)
 Kourou (97304)
 Macouria (97305)
 Matoury (97307)
 Montsinéry-Tonnegrande (97313)
 Remire-Montjoly (97309)
 Roura (97310)
 Saint-Élie (97358)
 Sinnamary (97312)

History

The arrondissement of Cayenne, containing the coastal strip of French Guiana, was established in 1947. In 1969 the arrondissement of Inini, which covered the inland territory of French Guiana, was disbanded, and the territory of French Guiana was divided between the arrondissement of Cayenne and the new arrondissement of Saint-Laurent-du-Maroni.

Before 2015, the arrondissements of French Guiana were subdivided into cantons. The cantons of the arrondissement of Cayenne were, as of January 2015:

 Approuague-Kaw
 Cayenne 1st Canton Nord-Ouest
 Cayenne 2nd Canton Nord-Est
 Cayenne 3rd Canton Sud-Ouest
 Cayenne 4th Canton Centre
 Cayenne 5th Canton Sud
 Cayenne 6th Canton Sud-Est
 Iracoubo
 Kourou
 Macouria
 Matoury
 Montsinéry-Tonnegrande
 Rémiré-Montjoly
 Roura
 Saint-Georges-de-l'Oyapock
 Sinnamary

A government decree of October 26, 2022 detached the four communes of Saint-Georges, Camopi, Ouanary, and Régina from the arrondissement of Cayenne to form the new arrondissement of Saint-Georges.

References

Cayenne